Inés Gómez-Mont Arena (born July 29, 1983) is a Mexican television host, journalist and model.  She was the host of TV Azteca's Los 25+ and co-host of Ventaneando.

Career
Gómez-Mont first gained attention as an actress in 1997 with the telenovela Tric Trac.  In 2002, she started working in the news production department of TV Azteca. She later joined the entertainment department, directed by Paty Chapoy. In 2004, she received the opportunity to host Los 25+. She later joined the team of Ventaneando in 2005 and also TV Azteca's sports reporters. Gomez Mont gained notoriety in the English speaking world when, at the Super Bowl Media Day for Super Bowl XLII, she attended a news conference with New England Patriots quarterback Tom Brady wearing a revealing wedding dress and pleaded with Brady to marry her.

Personal life
She was married to Javier Díaz, with whom she had four children. Since 2015, she is married to Víctor Álvarez and they had two other children.

References 

1983 births
Living people
Mexican telenovela actresses
Mexican television presenters
Actresses from Mexico City
Mexican women television presenters